Edmond Wayne Burke (September 7, 1935 – March 31, 2020) was a justice of the Alaska Supreme Court from April 4, 1975, to December 1, 1993. He also severed a term as chief justice from November 16, 1981, to September 30, 1984.

Born in Ukiah, California, where his father was a judge, Burke received his J.D. from the University of California, Hastings College of the Law in 1964. He was a judge of the Alaska Superior Court from 1970 until his appointment to the Alaska Supreme Court by Governor Jay Hammond in 1975.

References

External links
Image of Justice Burke on Imgur

1935 births
People from Ukiah, California
People from Anchorage, Alaska
University of California, Hastings College of the Law alumni
Justices of the Alaska Supreme Court
2020 deaths
Chief Justices of the Alaska Supreme Court